Katherine Saunders (or Katharine; later, Katherine Cooper; 1841-1894) was an English novelist of the Victorian era.

Saunders published fiction during the 1870s and 1880s.  The eldest daughter of the writer John Saunders, she had 11 siblings. Saunders co-wrote the book Martin Pole (1863) with her father.

Saunders married the Rev. Richard Cooper in 1876.

Selected works
Martin Pole (1863) (with John Saunders)
The Haunted Crust (1871)
Margaret and Elisabeth: a Story of the Sea (1873)Joan Merry weather, and other Tales (1874)Gideon's Rock, and other Tales (1874)The High Mills (1875)Sebastian: a Novel (1878)Heart Salvage by Sea and Land (1884)Nearly in Port; or, Phoebe Mustyn's Life-Story (1886)Diamonds in Darkness: a Christmas Story'' (1838)

References

1841 births
1894 deaths
English women novelists
19th-century English novelists
19th-century English women writers